Figgkidd is an Australian rapper from Bankstown, New South Wales. He is often compared to Eminem. He won best new talent at the 2006 Urban Music Awards. He no longer performs under this moniker and now releases music under his birth name.

Discography

Albums

Singles

References

Living people
Australian male rappers
Year of birth missing (living people)
Rappers from Sydney